Senator Fawell may refer to:

Beverly Fawell (1930–2013), Illinois State Senate
Harris W. Fawell (born 1929), Illinois State Senate

See also
Senator Farwell (disambiguation)